Hit the Road is an American sitcom created by Jason Alexander, Peter Tilden and Dean Craig. The series stars Jason Alexander, Amy Pietz, Natalie Sharp, Nick Marini, Tim Johnson Jr. and Maddie Dixon-Poirier. The series premiered on Audience on October 17, 2017.

On December 31, 2017, Alexander confirmed on his official Twitter account that the series would not return for a second season.

Cast and characters

Main  
Jason Alexander as Ken Swallow 
Amy Pietz as Meg Swallow 
Natalie Sharp as Ria Swallow
Nick Marini as Alex Swallow
Tim Johnson Jr. as Jermaine Swallow
Maddie Dixon-Poirier as Casey Swallow

Recurring
 Maddie Phillips as Girl Alex
 Christian Sloan as Bailor
 Jerry Wasserman as Gary Vestimonte
 Siobhan Williams as Carissa
 Elfina Luk as Dr. Helen Nguyen
 Samantha Ferris as Linda
 Ian Collins as Luke

Episodes

References

External links
 

2010s American musical comedy television series
2010s American sitcoms
2017 American television series debuts
2017 American television series endings
English-language television shows
Audience (TV network) original programming
Television series about dysfunctional families